Tahir Mehmood Ashrafi is a religious cleric and the nominated head of the an organisation All Pakistan Ulema Council in Pakistan.

Life
Ashrafi is a member of the Supreme Council of an NGO, Muslim World League, Mecca. He serves as the President Wafaq ul Masajid Pakistan.

Hafiz Muhammad Tahir Mehmood Ashrafi
Chairman Pakistan Ulema Council

He was also former Advisor to President of Pakistan for Interior and Affairs of Islamic World.

Hafiz Muhammad Tahir Mehmood Ashrafi has been awarded President Award for Peace and Human Rights, OIC Award for Peace & Harmony and Hafiz-e-Quran. He is chairman of Pakistan Ulema Council & Special Representative Prime Minister of Pakistan for Middle East and Interfaith Harmony. He is also the member of Supreme Council of Muslim World League, Mecca. He is president of Dar-ul-Afta Pakistan. He is Khateeb in Grand Jamia Masjid Behria Town, Lahore and Mohtamim Madrassa Marhaba Kurry Road, Rawalpindi.

He is President of Wafaq-ul-Masajid Madaris-e-Pakistan (One- Madras e Masjid Organization) and National Reconciliation Council of Pakistan for Interfaith Harmony.

His past appointments includes Former Advisor to President of Pakistan for Affairs of Islamic World, Ex-Advisor to Government of Punjab (Equivalent of Minister ), Ex-Member Council of Islamic Ideology, Govt. of Pakistan, Senior Analyst PTV News, Express News, SAMA News, Business Plus, Chief Editor Monthly Alhuriya International, Former President of Jamiat Talab e Islam.

He is highly educated. He has done PhD Honorary (Arabic language), M.A (Arabic, Islamic Studies), Fazil (Wifaqul Madarisul Arabia Pakistan), Fazil (Jamiatul Ashrafia), B.A (Journalism) from Punjab University, F.A from Board of Intermediate & Secondary Education Lahore and Matriculation from Board of Intermediate & Secondary Education Lahore.

On 22 October 2020 he is appointed as Special Representative on the Religious Harmony and the Middle East by Prime Minister Imran Khan.

Books

He is the Author of:
Khutbat-e-Akabir (خطبات اکابر)
Rwadari Sirat-e-Tayyaba ki Roshni me (رواداری سیرت طیبہ کی روشنی میں)
Muslim Hukmran Or Ghair Muslim Raia (مسلم حکمران اور غیر مسلم رعایا)
 Hazrat Ghulam Ghaus Hazarvi (حضرت غلام غوث ہزارویؒ)
FATWA Jehad Or Deshat Gardi Kiya Hai (فتویٰ جہاد اور دہشت گردی کیا ہے)
FATWA – Polio Vaccine Hilal Hai (فتوی پولیو ویکسین حلال ہے)
Islam or Asar-e-Hazir K Masail (اسلام اور عصر حاضر کے مسائل)
Mushtarka FATWA (مشترکہ فتویٰ)

References

Living people
Pakistani Islamists
Deobandis
Year of birth missing (living people)
Pakistani Islamic religious leaders
Pakistani Sunni Muslim scholars of Islam